Peter Valentine (born 16 April 1963) is an English former professional footballer who made nearly 500 appearances in the Football League playing as a centre back for Huddersfield Town, Bolton Wanderers, Bury, Carlisle United and Rochdale.

References

External links

1963 births
Living people
Footballers from Huddersfield
English footballers
Association football defenders
Huddersfield Town A.F.C. players
Bolton Wanderers F.C. players
Bury F.C. players
Carlisle United F.C. players
Rochdale A.F.C. players
English Football League players